Nails is a 1992 film directed by John Flynn, written by Larry Ferguson, and starring Dennis Hopper. It was made for Showtime but released theatrically in Europe.

Cast

References

External links

1992 films
1992 television films
Showtime (TV network) original programming
Films directed by John Flynn
Films with screenplays by Larry Ferguson
Films scored by Bill Conti
American crime drama films
Viacom Pictures films
American drama television films
1990s American films